Tropfest is the world's largest short film festival. It has also become known as the world's first global film festival.

Founded by actor/director John Polson, Tropfest began in 1993 as a screening for 200 people at the 'Tropicana Caffe'  in Darlinghurst, Sydney, Australia, but has since become the largest platform for short films in the world. Tropfest Australia usually takes place in February each year in Sydney and it has been broadcast live via free-to-air television as well as global streaming and catch up. Sydney Tropfest 2015 was cancelled less than a month before it was scheduled to run. After much support on social media, Tropfest founder Polson announced in early December 2015 that extra funding had been sourced, and the festival took place in Centennial Park on Sunday, 14 February 2016. In August 2016 it was announced that from February 2017 Sydney's Tropfest would be held in Parramatta in western Sydney, in Parramatta Park.

Entry requirements
Tropfest differs from other cinema events by being a "content generation" platform, rather than an exhibition platform. Filmmakers are required to create new works for the festival which must include an item, known as the "Tropfest Signature Item" (TSI) and which changes each year. The films must be less than 7 minutes (including titles and credits) and be world premieres at the Tropfest event.

History
The festival's name is derived from the first year's location—the Tropicana Caffe in Darlinghurst, an inner-eastern suburb of Sydney. Created by Australian-born filmmaker John Polson, the first festival was held in 1993 and was originally called the Tropicana Short Film Festival.

The support and involvement of film personalities from around the world has become one of the trademarks of the festival. Selection of the winning Tropfest film takes place live on the night of the festival by a panel of high-profile industry and celebrity judges, in addition to the previous year's winner. Past judges have included Nicole Kidman, Cate Blanchett, Naomi Watts, Toni Collette, Rose Byrne, Geoffrey Rush, Russell Crowe, John Woo, Samuel L. Jackson, Baz Luhrmann, Keanu Reeves, Sam Neill, Ewan McGregor, Jane Campion, Salma Hayek, George Miller, Susan Sarandon and Gabriel Byrne. Judges in 2018 included Eric Bana, Aaron Pedersen, Marta Dusseldorp, David Michôd, Jessica McNamee and Michele Bennett. Corporate supporters have included Intel, Sony, Qantas, Cointreau and MadFish Wines. Movie Extra used to be the primary sponsor of Tropfest Australia, which is now supported by Holden, Parramatta City Council, Screen Australia, WSU, Parramatta Park and Melrose Park.

The festival attracts a wide degree of media coverage but it is the casual, grassroots nature of the event, rather than its high profile, which ensures the continued support of its patrons and guests. Notable alumni include filmmakers and actors such as Alister Grierson, Rowan Woods, Clayton Jacobson, Alethea Jones, Joel Edgerton, Daina Reid, Nash Edgerton, Peter Carstairs, Rob Carlton, Rebel Wilson, Sam Worthington, Robert Connolly, Leon Ford, Justin Drape, Tim Bullock and Elissa Down.

Tropfest now includes the popular Trop Jr, a short filmmaking competition and festival for youngsters under 16.

Other Tropfest programs have included:

 APRA TROPSCORE, a film scoring and synching competition
 Nikon DSLR Film Category, a category in the competition awarding short films created using DSLR technology
 Holden 7 second Challenge, a 7-second film competition

Locations
The main event from 1993 to 2016 took place in Sydney but live satellite events have also been staged in Melbourne, Canberra, Brisbane, Adelaide, Hobart, Perth and other cities. The event has been broadcast live on television by ABC Comedy, Movie Network, SBS and other networks and webcast to viewers around Australia and the world. In August 2016 it was announced that, beginning in February 2017, the venue would be moved to Parramatta in western Sydney.

Tropfest has expanded to locations around the world including Japan, Turkey, Africa, Abu Dhabi, London, Berlin, Toronto, Bangkok, and New York City. The inaugural Tropfest Arabia, encompassing approximately 33 countries throughout the Middle East and North Africa, took place in Abu Dhabi in November 2011. Tropfest launched into the United States in June 2012, with a weekend-long event in Las Vegas and a fully-fledged Tropfest New York competition in New York on 23 June 2012 at Manhattan's Bryant Park. Tropfest New Zealand launched in 2013 and Tropfest South East Asia at Penang, Malaysia in 2014.

Festival

Each year there are hundreds and hundreds of entries featuring the TSI and every year 16 finalists are screened in public to a huge live audience in Sydney. Annual audiences of around 100,000 people in The Domain have been recorded, to watch the finalists on large video screens. With a television and on-line audience, this number swells to hundreds of thousands.

The Sydney screening of Tropfest 2006 was abandoned after 13 films due to severe electrical storms. Screenings in other cities were not affected. With the judges located in Sydney it was necessary to announce the winners two days later at a press conference.

Each film must be no longer than seven minutes, have never been shown publicly before and contain the "Tropfest Signature Item", which changes each year, to show that the film was made specifically for the festival.

In April 2007, Tropfest formed a partnership with PBL Media which would see festival content archived and screened across various PBL properties and brands.

For Tropfest 2009, pay television channel Movie Extra replaced Sony as the naming rights sponsor for the next seven years.  A new feature in 2009 was the live national broadcast of Tropfest and screening of the finalist films on the Movie Extra channel.

Tropfest Australia 2011 was the largest Tropfest ever staged, and reached a national audience of approximately 1,000,000 people (not including the internet).

Prior to the first full Tropfest New York competition in June 2012, Tropfest held annual New York screenings between 2006 and 2008. Signature items were a manhole cover, a slice, and a sunflower respectively. In November 2011, ahead of the 2012 competition, filmmakers were invited to "grab a camera, start shooting and tell their story through film", using the Tropfest NY 2012 Signature Item of "Bagel".

Over a weekend in June 2012, The Cosmopolitan in Las Vegas celebrated Tropfest's 20th anniversary, culminating in a screening of the best 16 films from the past two decades in the Tropfest All Star Competition. With judges Toni Collette (President of the Jury), Tobey Maguire, Rebel Wilson, James Woods, Anthony LaPaglia, Trevor Groth and Charles Randolph presiding over the competition, The Story of Bubble Boy, directed by Sean Ascroft, ultimately took out the top prize.

A few weeks later, on 23 June 2012, Tropfest New York had its debut in Bryant Park. Hosted by Hugh Jackman and including musical performances by Alexi Murdoch and Milagres, the festival attracted a crowd of approximately 10,000. Judges Rose Byrne, Judah Friedlander, Jennifer Westfeldt, Scott Foundas and Ted Hope awarded the $20,000 first prize to director Josh Leake for his film Emptys.  Tropfest NY 2013 festival was held on 22 June in Brooklyn's Prospect Park, with a bridge as the signature item.  In 2014 Tropfest postponed its New York event.  The festival planned a 2015 event, using a kiss as the signature item, which was originally announced for 2014.

Tropfest has one of the most successful channels on YouTube, having attracted more than 45,000,000 video views for its films in a relatively short time period.

In February 2013 festival founder John Polson announced a change of date to 8 December and a change of venue from the Domain to Centennial Park.  We feel like we are changing gears, we are growing every year and Centennial Park is in some ways the emotional heart of Sydney

The winner of the December 2013 festival, Bamboozled, was accused of homophobia and transphobia. It is a comedy in which a man sleeps with a man he believes to be his transitioned ex-girlfriend.

2015 cancellation
On 11 November Polson announced that the 2015 Sydney Tropfest had been cancelled. He said "... I have been made aware that the company contracted to raise the funding and administer the Tropfest event is unable to move forward for financial reasons.". CEO of Tropfest Festival Productions, Michael Laverty, has been unavailable for comment.

Financial difficulties
Polsons said he had discovered to his “surprise” Tropfest was facing a financial crisis and could not proceed due to a lack of funds. It emerged the management company Polson had fallen out with over the alleged “mismanagement” of Tropfest funds was managed by Laverty, his long-time Tropfest partner and its managing director.

Over the following days it emerged suppliers and contracted partners of Tropfest have been experiencing payment delays for several months. As of 14 November Laverty was un-contactable for any comments. Commercial entertainment services agency The Intersection, who was retained in 2014 by Tropfest issued a statement on Facebook stating its relationship with Tropfest ended in 2014 over a pay dispute.

An outpouring of support for Tropfest quickly appeared over social media, including Twitter and Facebook, with calls for generous benefactors, state or federal government support, or crowd-funding.

On 6 December Polson announced that the Sydney festival would be held in its intended venue, Centennial Park on Sunday, 14 February 2016.  CGU Insurance is the source of the necessary extra funding.

Signature item
Each year, Tropfest requires that entries include a particular "signature item" or action to ensure that they are unique and are made specifically for the festival. No TSI was required for the 1993 festival. The following are TSIs by year:
 2019Candle
 2018Rose
 2017Pineapple 
 2015Card
 2014Mirror
 2013, DecemberChange
 2013, FebruaryBalloon
 2012Lightbulb
 2011Key
 2010Dice
 2009Spring
 2008The Number 8
 2007Sneeze
 2006Bubble
 2005Umbrella
 2004Hook
 2003Rock
 2002Match
 2001Horn
 2000Bug
 1999Chopsticks
 1998Kiss
 1997Pickle
 1996Teaspoon
 1995Coffee Bean
 1994Muffin
 1993Not Applicable

See also
List of festivals in Australia
2006 Tropfest finalists
2007 Tropfest finalists
2008 Tropfest finalists

References

External links
 
 Tropfest YouTube Channel

 
Film festivals established in 1993
Short film festivals in Australia